Federal Intelligence Service may refer to:

 Federal Intelligence Service (Germany) (or Bundesnachrichtendienst; BND) of Germany
 Swiss intelligence agencies

See also
National Intelligence Service (disambiguation)
Foreign Intelligence service (disambiguation)
State Intelligence Service (disambiguation)
General Intelligence Directorate (disambiguation)
Directorate of Military Intelligence (disambiguation)
Intelligence Bureau (disambiguation)